Events in the year 1939 in India.

Incumbents
 Emperor of India – George VI
 Viceroy of India – Victor Hope, 2nd Marquess of Linlithgow

Events
 National income - 31,845 million
 World War II breaks out and political dead lock in India
 2 January – The Muslim League at Patna disapproves the Federation scheme which has already been disapproved by Congress.
 29 January – Subhas Chandra Bose is reelected president of Congress at Bombay (a victory for opponents of Federation).
 22 February – Thirteen right-wing members of the working committee, including Pandit Nehru, resign from Congress.
 3 March – In Bombay, Mohandas Gandhi begins to fast in protest of the autocratic rule in India.
 12 March – Congress at Tripuri passes a resolution of adherence to the party of Gandhi.
 29 April – S. C. Bose resigns as president of Congress and is succeeded by Rajendra Prasad.
 1 May – New Congress working committee announced.
 3 May – S. C. Bose announces the formation of a new left bloc under his leadership.
 8–14 September – Congress debates its attitude to the war; Gandhi calls upon the British to implement their declarations of faith in democracy.
 18 September – The Muslim League declares that the Federal scheme, now suspended, should be altogether abandoned.
 17 October – The Viceroy states the Allied objectives in the war and announces that at the end of the war the Government would consult the several communities, parties and interests in India.
 27–31 October – Congress working committee resolved that the Viceroy's statement was wholly unsatisfactory and asked for a statement of war aims; the ministries of Bombay, Madras and Bihar resign.
 3 November – Resignation of the ministry of the United Provinces.
 5 November – Resignation of the ministry of Orissa; the Viceroy announces that the parties having met have failed to agree.
 9 November – Resignation of the ministry of Central Provinces.
 23 November – At Allahabad the Congress working committee reaffirms its demand for "recognition of India's independence".
 2 December - Jinnah's call for observing 22nd as Day of Deliverance in favour of resignation and end of congress ministries in provinces.
 27 December – The first contingent of Indian troops reaches France.

Law
 28 February – The budget is presented to the Legislative Assembly in which the duty on raw cotton is doubled.
 13 March – The Chamber of Princes approves its own reorganization.
 20 March – A new trade agreement with the UK till 31 March 1942 is signed after two years of negotiations.
 15 April – The new tariff bill is rejected by the Central Legislature.
 18 April – The Council of State passes the new tariff bill a second time.
Registration Of Foreigners Act
Portuguese Code of Civil Procedure
Commercial Documents Evidence Act
Dissolution of Muslim Marriages Act
Limitation Act

Births
11 March – Bani Basu, author, essayist, critic and poet.
19 May  Balu Mahendra, film director and cinematographer (d. 2014).
27 June – R. D. Burman, composer, singer (died 1994)
7 July – Satya Prakash Agarwal, politician
20 July – Walter Devaram, retired Indian Police Service officer
25 July – Mahendran, Indian film director, screenwriter and actor (d. 2019)
1 August – Jambuwantrao Dhote, Indian politician (d. 2017).
16 August  Kanchana, actress. 
17 August –  Farooq Feroze Khan, Pakistani air chief marshal (d. 2021)
15 September – Subramanian Swamy, Indian politician and economist.
29 October – Malay Roy Choudhury, poet and novelist
22 November – Mulayam Singh Yadav, politician and former Chief Minister of Uttar Pradesh (died 2022)
12 December – Swadesh Bharati, poet, novelist and literary critic.
14 December – Mythili Sivaraman, activist (d. 2021)

Full date unknown
Arun Joshi, novelist (died 1993).

References

 
India
Years of the 20th century in India
India in World War II